Malda Polytechnic is the one of the oldest Government Polytechnic college of West Bengal, India under the Department of Technical Education & Training, Government of West Bengal. This College offers diploma courses in 5(five) streams of Engineering conducted by West Bengal State Council of Technical Education. This college was established in 1962 in the form of a Govt. Sponsored Polytechnic and subsequently it became a Government Polytechnic. It is an elite Institute of Malda District with the maximum percentage of placement in Government and Private sectors. This college has a strong infrastructure consisting of well equipped and spacious laboratories, workshops, library, audio-visual cell, training and placement cell etc. This polytechnic is affiliated to the West Bengal State Council of Technical Education,  and recognised by AICTE, New Delhi.

Admission

Admission to most diploma in engineering courses at Malda Polytechnic is granted through written entrance examination JEXPO (Joint Entrance Exam for Polytechnic) conducted by the Government of West Bengal.

Fee Structure:

Departments
Full Time Diploma Courses:( Duration: 3 years)

Library

Malda Polytechnic Library enables necessary books to the students of this institute.

Facilities Offered

Malda Polytechnic Hostel 

Malda Polytechnic provide both Boys & Girls Hostel for poor Students.

Hostel Fees:

Note: The fees of the college keep Changing Every Year. For more Detail about the College Fee Contact the college Authority.

External links 

Department of Technical Education & Training, Government of West Bengal
Directorate of Technical Education & Training, Government of West Bengal
West Bengal State Council of Technical Education
Malda Polytechnic in wikimapia

References

Universities and colleges in Malda district
Educational institutions established in 1962
1962 establishments in West Bengal
Education in Malda district
Technical universities and colleges in West Bengal